Sureshkumar Bhikamchand Jain, better known as Sureshdada Jain, is an Indian politician from Jalgaon, Maharashtra. He changed his party affiliation a number of times in his political career and has been elected to the Maharashtra Vidhan Sabha for a record nine times. 

He was a minister in Maharashtra government and was a main conspirator in Jalgaon Gharkul Ghotala.

Political career 
Jain was elected from Jalgaon constituency in 1980 as an Indian National Congress (Indira) candidate, in 1985 as an Indian Congress (Socialist) candidate, in 1990 as an Indian Congress (Socialist) – Sarat Chandra Sinha candidate, in 1995 as an Indian National Congress candidate, in 1999 as a Shiv Sena candidate, in 2004, as a Nationalist Congress Party candidate and in 2009, he was elected from Jalgaon City constituency as a Shiv Sena candidate.

1980 to 2014 Elected nine times consecutively as MLA to the State of Maharashtra Legislative Assembly. During this period, he has been elected / selected to different political positions as under:

In the 1990s Jain was in the Shiv Sena party and served as a state minister. He was a prominent leader for Shivsena in North Maharashtra.

Jalgaon Housing Scam

In 1996, Jain was the main accused in the Jalgaon housing scam and was sentenced to jail. Jalgaon police arrested him in March 2012 on the on the basis of inquiry report submitted by then Jalgaon municipal commissioner Pravin Gedam.  The Jalgaon district court found him guilty, convicted him in this crime and sentenced fine of 110 crore with seven years of imprisonment.

Positions held
 1980: Elected to Maharashtra Legislative Assembly
 1985: Elected to Maharashtra Legislative Assembly
 1990: Elected to Maharashtra Legislative Assemblybam
 1995: Elected to Maharashtra Legislative Assembly
 1995: Cabinet Minister, Maharashtra State Government
 1999: Elected to Maharashtra Legislative Assembly
 2004: Elected to Maharashtra Legislative Assembly
 2009: Elected to Maharashtra Legislative Assembly

source:

References 

Year of birth missing (living people)
Living people
People from Jalgaon
State cabinet ministers of Maharashtra
Shiv Sena politicians
Indian Congress (Socialist) politicians
Nationalist Congress Party politicians
People convicted of corruption
Prisoners and detainees of Maharashtra
Indian politicians convicted of corruption
Indian National Congress politicians from Maharashtra
Maharashtra MLAs 1980–1985
Maharashtra MLAs 1985–1990
Maharashtra MLAs 1990–1995
Maharashtra MLAs 1995–1999
Maharashtra MLAs 1999–2004
Maharashtra MLAs 2004–2009
Maharashtra MLAs 2009–2014